Tephritoresta is a genus of tephritid  or fruit flies in the family Tephritidae.

Species
Tephritoresta debilis Hering, 1942

References

Tephritinae
Tephritidae genera
Diptera of Africa